John Selwyn may refer to:

John Selwyn (1688–1751), English army officer and Member of Parliament
John Selwyn (c. 1709–51), son of the preceding, English Member of Parliament
John Selwyn (bishop) (1844–98), Anglican Bishop of Melanesia
John Selwyn Moll (1913-1942), English rugby union player